The Joint Functional Component Command – Network Warfare (JFCC-NW) at Fort Meade, Maryland was a subordinate component command of United States Strategic Command (USSTRATCOM) active from 2005 to 2010. It was responsible for coordinating offensive computer network operations for the United States Department of Defense (DoD). JFCC-NW was created in 2005. It was merged into United States Cyber Command in October 2010.

The Commander, JFCC-NW (currently Admiral Michael S. Rogers) is dual-hatted as the Director, National Security Agency. This coordinated approach to information operations involves two other supporting commands. The Director, Defense Information Systems Agency also heads the Joint Task Force-Global Network Operations. This organization is responsible for operating and defending U.S. worldwide information networks, a function closely aligned with the efforts of JFCC-NW.

Mission
JFCC-NW facilitates/facilitated cooperative engagement with other national entities in computer network defense and offensive information warfare as part of the global information operations mission.

The command was responsible for the highly classified, evolving mission of Computer Network Attack (CNA).

See also
 Joint Task Force-Global Network Operations

References

United States Strategic Command
Net-centric
Command and control in the United States Department of Defense
Command and control systems of the United States military